Rubina Khalid may refer to:

Rubina Khalid (politician), Pakistani Senator
Rubina Khalid (qaria), Pakistani Quran reciter